O magnum mysterium (O great mystery) is a motet for choir a cappella by Morten Lauridsen. He set the text of "O magnum mysterium", a Gregorian chant for Christmas, in 1994. The composition, performed and recorded often, made Lauridsen famous. It was described as expressive ethereal sounds in imperturbable calmness.

History 
The American composer Morten Lauridsen is professor of composition at the USC Thornton School of Music. He wrote his setting of "O magnum mysterium" in 1994, on a commission from the Los Angeles Master Chorale, by Marshall Rutter for his wife Terry Knowles. 

The composition was first performed at the Dorothy Chandler Pavilion in Los Angeles on 18 December 1994 by the Los Angeles Master Chorale, conducted by Paul Salamunovich. It was published in 1995 by Southern Music Publishing. The popular setting was often performed and recorded and became one of Lauridsen's signature pieces. Sandra Dackow wrote an arrangement for strings.

Text and music 
The Latin text "O magnum mysterium" is a Gregorian chant from the fifth responsory of nine for Vigil on Christmas Day. It reflects first oxen and donkey next to the manger as first mentioned in Isaiah 1:3. and traditionally related to the nativity of Jesus as a symbol for the mystery of the self-abasement of God in his Incarnation. In a second theme, the text is based on the greeting of Elizabeth welcoming Mary when she visits.

The text was set to music by composers over the centuries, including Palestrina, Tomás Luis de Victoria and Francis Poulenc. Lauridsen set the text as a motet for SATB choir.

The composer said that he was inspired by a 1633 painting from the Norton Simon Museum, Zurbarán's Still Life with Lemons, Oranges and a Rose (1633), which has been interpreted as symbolism for the Virgin Mary. He described his intentions: "I wanted this piece to resonate immediately and deeply into the core of the listener, to illumine through sound." Lauridsen remembered that he worked on the composition for six months, and put considerable thinking into a dissonant chord to comment on Mary's sorrow about her son to be killed. Lauridsen said further that the work is meant as "a quiet song of profound inner joy", with music expressing both the mystery of the Incarnation and Mary's tenderness for her child.

Recordings 
The first performers recorded the work on a 2002 CD with other choral compositions by Lauridsen, entitled after one of them Lux aeterna. A reviewer noted the freshness of the around 90 singers who appear regularly with the Los Angeles Philharmonic Orchestra. He described the tonal music as influenced by Arvo Pärt and John Rutter. Lauridsen founded a choir of 22 international singers to perform his music, the Nordic Chamber Choir, in 1997. He worked with them on a recording of four pieces, including the title piece "O magnum mysterium", conducted with Nicol Matt. A reviewer noted the "higher simplicity" (höhere Einfachheit) achieved by simple melodies, expressive ethereal sounds, and imperturbable calmness.

References

External links 
 

Choral compositions
1994 compositions
Marian hymns